Major Sir David Edward Charles Steel  (29 November 1916 – 9 August 2004) was an English army officer, lawyer, and businessman. Steel was the sixth chairman of British Petroleum, from 1975 to 1981.

Steel was the son of Ellen Price-Edwards and Gerald Arthur Steel. His father was private secretary to the First Lord of the Admiralty throughout the First World War, and later general manager of the British Aluminium Company. Steel was educated at Rugby School, and University College, Oxford, where he received a bachelor's degree in law.

Steel was a tank commander in the Second World War, and was awarded the DSO* and an MC.

At the end of 1974, he succeeded Sir Eric Drake as chairman of BP.

On 3 November 1956, Steel married Ann Wynne Price, the daughter of Major-General Charles Basil Price, at St Paul's Anglican in Knowlton, Quebec. She predeceased him in 1997. Steel was a member of the Cavalry Club in London and the Links Club in New York City.

References

1916 births
2004 deaths
British businesspeople in the oil industry
British chairpersons of corporations
Businesspeople awarded knighthoods
Chairmen of BP
Knights Bachelor
9th Queen's Royal Lancers officers
British Army personnel of World War II
Alumni of University College, Oxford
People educated at Rugby School
20th-century British businesspeople